Mar Yousef VI Emmanuel II Thomas (August 8, 1852 - July 21, 1947) was the patriarch of the Chaldean Catholic Church from 1900 until his death in 1947.

Life

He was born on August 8, 1852 in Alqosh, An ethnic Chaldean he studied in the Ghazir Seminary in Lebanon and was ordained priest on July 10, 1879. On July 24, 1892 he was ordained Bishop of Seert, now in Turkey, by patriarch Eliya XIV [XIII] Abulyonan. He was appointed Patriarch of the Chaldean Church on the July 9, 1900 and confirmed by the Holy See on December 17 of the same year. He served as patriarch till his death on July 21, 1947. He replaced Patriarch Audishu V Khayyath and was followed by Yousef VII Ghanima.

References

 
 

 

1852 births
1947 deaths
Chaldean Catholic Patriarchs of Babylon
Assyrians from the Ottoman Empire
People from Alqosh
Eastern Catholic bishops in the Ottoman Empire